Irteassh is an all-girl A cappella band based in Karachi, Pakistan, which appeared in Coke Studio (Pakistani TV program) in Season 10. The band comprises 4 female vocalists Eman Pirzada, Ayesha Akbar Waheed, Sajar Nafees and Simal Nafees. Introduced by Salman Ahmad, Irteassh performed Ghoom Taana with Momina Mustehsan in Coke Studio (Pakistani season 10).

Early career 
The four girls were discovered by Salman Ahmed of Junoon (band) during a musical competition and he then took them to Coke Studio. Soon after the show, they formed a band and Ayesha Akbar Waheed came up with the name Irteassh that means wave forms of the voice.

External links 
 Irteassh on Facebook

Reference Links 

Pakistani musicians
A cappella musical groups
All-female bands
Musical groups established in 2017
2017 establishments in Pakistan